Elliott is an unincorporated community and census-designated place (CDP) in Grenada County, Mississippi, United States, and part of the Grenada Micropolitan Statistical Area. As of the 2010 census it had a population of 990.

Elliott is located on the southern edge of Grenada County, with its southern border following the Montgomery County line.

The community is in the valley of Batupan Bogue, a northwest-flowing tributary of the Yalobusha River.

Elliott is located on the former Illinois Central Railroad.

A post office operated under the name Elliott from 1860 to 1964.

Demographics

References

Census-designated places in Grenada County, Mississippi
Census-designated places in Mississippi